A rebus is a kind of word puzzle that uses pictures to represent words or parts of words.

Rebus may also refer to:
 Rebus (TV series), a television series based on the Inspector Rebus novels
 Rebus (film), a 1969 crime film
 Rebus (album), a 2007 album by Joe Morris
 Kartia: The Word of Fate, known in Japan as Rebus, a 1998 video game by Atlus.
 "Rebus", a song by Squarepusher from the 1997 album Hard Normal Daddy

See also
 Detective Inspector John Rebus, the protagonist in the Inspector Rebus novels
 Inspector Rebus, a series of detective novels by Ian Rankin
 Rebus coat-of-arms, a coat of arms where the individual or community represented is translated into a rebus